The 2006 congressional elections in Wisconsin were held on November 7, 2006, to determine who would represent the state of Wisconsin in the United States House of Representatives. Representatives were elected for two-year terms; those elected served in the 110th Congress from January 3, 2007, until January 3, 2009.  The election coincided with the 2006 U.S. senatorial election and the 2006 Wisconsin gubernatorial election.

Wisconsin has eight seats in the House, apportioned according to the 2000 United States Census. Its 2006-2007 congressional delegation consisted of four Democrats and four Republicans. That changed after the 2006 congressional elections in Wisconsin when the open 8th congressional district formerly held by Republican Mark Green, was won by Democratic Representative Steve Kagen.

Overview

District 1

Incumbent Republican Congressman Paul Ryan has represented this swing district in southeast Wisconsin since his initial election in 1998. Though this district only barely went to President George W. Bush in 2004, defeating Congressman Ryan was not a priority for the Democratic Party, and the Democratic nominee was former Janesville City Councilman and perennial candidate Jeff Thomas, whom Ryan was able to handily beat, even in an unfavorable election year for Republicans.

District 2

Incumbent Democratic Congresswoman Tammy Baldwin, the only openly lesbian member of Congress, has represented this deep-blue district located in Madison and vicinity since 1999. This year, Baldwin was able to win a fifth term in a rematch from 2004 against Republican candidate Dave Magnum.

District 3

Democratic Congressman Ron Kind has represented this western Wisconsin-based district since he was first elected in 1996 and sought a sixth term this year against Republican nominee Paul Nelson. Congressman Kind was successful and won another term in Congress.

District 4

Freshman Democratic Congresswoman Gwen Moore ran for a second term in this district based in the city of Milwaukee. Congresswoman Moore faced Republican candidate Perfecto Rivera, whom she was easily able to dispatch with to return to Washington for another term.

District 5

Incumbent Republican Congressman Jim Sensenbrenner, who has represented this solidly conservative district based in the northern suburbs of Milwaukee since 1979, ran for a fifteenth term this year. Congressman Sensenbrenner faced Democratic candidate Bryan Kennedy, who was able to perform surprisingly well in this district, though he ultimately fell to Sensenbrenner in the general election.

District 6

Facing no major-party opposition, incumbent Republican Congressman Tom Petri was easily able to retain his seat for a fourteenth term in this heavily conservative district located in the cities of Oshkosh and Neenah.

District 7

Long-serving Democratic Congressman Dave Obey, a high-ranking member on the House Appropriations Committee and the dean of Wisconsin's congressional delegation, ran for a twentieth term in Congress against Republican candidate Nick Reid and Green Party candidate Mike Miles. Obey has represented northwest Wisconsin for decades, and retained his seat by a large margin.

District 8

When incumbent Republican Congressman Mark Green declined to seek a fifth term, instead opting to run for Governor, an open seat was created. Physician Steve Kagen defeated business consultant Jamie Wall and former Brown County Executive Nancy Nusbaum in the Democratic primary, while the Speaker of the State Assembly John Gard defeated fellow State Representative Terri McCormick in the Republican primary.  Gard and Kagen duked it out in this marginally conservative district, with the election becoming the most expensive congressional election in Wisconsin state history. Ultimately, Kagen was able to take advantage of the Democratic wave sweeping the country and defeated Gard to seize the seat for the Democrats.

References

External links
Wisconsin State Elections Board
Fall 2006 Election Cycle Page
Wispolitics.com  Wisconsin's political report
The Wheeler Report

Wisconsin
2006
2006 Wisconsin elections